Garret Club is a historic woman's clubhouse located at Buffalo in Erie County, New York.  It was designed by noted Buffalo architect Edward Brodhead Green and constructed in 1929.  It is a two-story, "L"-shaped building constructed of hollow tile with a stucco finish.  It has a slate tile roof and is reflective of French vernacular architecture.

It was listed on the National Register of Historic Places in 2007.  It is located in the Elmwood Historic District–East.

The club was founded in March 1902.  Katharine Cornell joined in 1913 and was an active member, participating in theatrical productions.

References

External links
 The Garret Club - Buffalo, NY
 Garret Club - Buffalo, NY - U.S. National Register of Historic Places on Waymarking.com

Clubhouses on the National Register of Historic Places in New York (state)
Buildings and structures completed in 1929
Buildings and structures in Buffalo, New York
National Register of Historic Places in Buffalo, New York
Historic district contributing properties in Erie County, New York
Green & Wicks buildings